Arthrodira (Greek for "jointed neck") is an order of extinct armored, jawed fishes of the class Placodermi that flourished in the Devonian period before their sudden extinction, surviving for about 50 million years and penetrating most marine ecological niches. Arthrodires were the largest and most diverse of all groups of Placoderms.

Description
Arthrodire placoderms are notable for the movable joint between armor surrounding their heads and bodies. Like all placoderms, they lacked distinct teeth; instead, they used the sharpened edges of a bony plate on their jawbone as a biting surface. The eye sockets are covered by a bony ring, which supports the eye, a feature shared by birds and some ichthyosaurs. Early arthrodires, such as the genus Arctolepis, were well-armoured fishes with flattened bodies.  The largest member of this group, Dunkleosteus, was a true superpredator of the latest Devonian period, reaching as much as 6 m in length. In contrast, the long-nosed Rolfosteus measured just 15 cm. Fossils of Incisoscutum have been found containing unborn fetuses, indicating that arthrodires gave birth to live young.

A common misconception is the arthrodires (along with all other placoderms) were sluggish bottom-dwellers that were outcompeted by more advanced fish. Leading to this misconception is that the arthrodire body plan remained relatively conserved (that is, the majority of arthrodires were bullet- or torpedo-shaped) during the Devonian period, save for increasing in size. However, during their reign, the arthrodires were one of the most diverse and numerically successful, if not the most successful, vertebrate orders of the Devonian, occupying a vast spectrum of roles from apex predator to detritus-nibbling bottom dweller. Despite their success, the arthrodires were one of many groups eliminated by the environmental catastrophes of the Late Devonian extinction, allowing other fish such as sharks to diversify into the vacated ecological niches during the Carboniferous period.

Phylogeny
The order Arthrodira belongs to the class Placodermi, the large group of extinct prehistoric armored fish that is thought to have diverged over 400 million years ago from all sharks and bony fishes (and thus also all subsequent tetrapods, including mammals, birds, reptiles and amphibians). However, recent phylogenetic studies have found Placodermi to be paraphyletic, and rather an evolutionary grade towards Eugnathostomata, the clade grouping that contains sharks and bony fish and all tetrapods.

Arthrodira was traditionally divided into the paraphyletic Actinolepida, the Phlyctaenii (now also paraphyletic), and the Brachythoraci. Phylogenetic studies have since found two of those groups as paraphyletic, as shown in the cladogram below, from Dupret et al. (2009).

Classification
Order Arthrodira Woodward, 1891
 Phlyctaenioidei Miles, 1973
 Brachythoraci Gross, 1932 (includes the well-known Dunkleosteus, Dinichthys, etc.)
 Williamsaspididae White, 1952
 Groenlandaspididae Obruchev, 1964
 Arctolepididae Stensiö, 1959
 Phlyctaeniidae Fowler, 1947
 Actinolepidae Gross, 1940
 Phyllolepida Stensiö 1934
 Wuttagoonaspidae Ritchie 1973
 Genera incertae sedis
 Aethaspis Denison, 1958 (may be within Actinolepidae)
 Aleosteus  Johnson et al., 2000 (may be within Actinolepidae)
 Anarthraspis Bryant, 1934 (may be within Actinolepidae)
 Antarctaspis White, 1968 (previously within Antarctaspididae)
 Antarctolepis White, 1968
 Aspidichthys Newberry, 1873
 Baringaspis Miles, 1973 (may be within Actinolepidae)
 Bryantolepis Denison, 1958 (may be within Actinolepidae)
 Callognathus Newberry, 1890
 Copanognathus Hussakof & Bryant, 1920
 Carolowilhelmina Mark-Kurik & Carls, 2002
 Diplognathus Newberry, 1878
 Erikaspis Dupret, Goujet, & Mark-Kurik, 2007
 Eskimaspis Dineley & Yuhai, 1984
 Glyptaspis Newberry, 1890
 Grazosteus Gross, 1958
 Heightingtonaspis White, 1969 (may be within Actinolepidae)
 Hollardosteus Lehman, 1956
 Kujdanowiaspis Stensiö, 1942 (may be within Actinolepidae)
 Lataspis Strand, 1932 (may be within Actinolepidae)
 Laurentaspis Pageau, 1969
 Lehmanosteus Goujet, 1984 (may be within Actinolepidae)
 Machaerognathus Hussakof & Bryant, 1919
 Maideria Lelièvre, 1995
 Mediaspis Heintz, 1929 (may be within Actinolepidae)
 Murmur Whitley, 1951
 Overtonaspis White, 1961
 Phylactaenium Heintz, 1934
 Pinguosteus Long, 1990 (may be within Brachythoraci)
 Prescottaspis White, 1961
 Proaethaspis Denison, 1978 (may be within Actinolepidae)
 Qataraspis White, 1969
 Sigaspis Goujet, 1973 (may be within Actinolepidae)
 Simblaspis Denison, 1958 (may be within Actinolepidae)
 Taunaspis Schmidt, 1933
 Timanosteus Obrucheva, 1962
 Trachosteus Newberry, 18903 (may be within Coccosteidae)
 Wheathillaspis White, 1961
 Yujiangolepis Wang & Dupret, 2009 (previously within Antarctaspididae)

References

Further reading
  (1996): The Rise of Fishes: 500 Million Years of Evolution. Johns Hopkins University Press, Baltimore. 

 
Prehistoric fish orders
Articles which contain graphical timelines